Jetfighter is a  series of 3D combat flight simulation computer games that was developed by Velocity Development starting in 1988.  The player would fly a combat jet aircraft in the skies against enemy forces. The game boasted 3D graphics that were cutting-edge at the time of the game's release, and used real-world terrain. The games seldom sold well because they occupied an uncomfortable middle ground of game design - too much flight simulator for action game fans, as they realistically emulated actual combat aircraft, but too simplistic for the hardcore sim fans, who always preferred games more along the lines of the Falcon series. The series ended after the commercial failure of Jetfighter 2015.  The later games had support for 3dfx Voodoo cards to run natively in DOS.

Jetfighter II was produced before the winner of the Advanced Tactical Fighter competition was announced; the programmers chose to emulate the YF-23 "Black Widow II" as the winning aircraft rather than the eventual winner, the YF-22 (which "entered service" in 2004 as the F-22 Raptor).

Games

Reception
In the United States, Jetfighter IVs jewel case version sold 270,000 copies and earned $2.6 million by August 2006, after its release in January 2002. It was the country's 75th best-selling computer game between January 2000 and August 2006. Combined sales of all Jetfighter computer games released between January 2000 and August 2006 had reached 450,000 units in the United States by the latter date.

In a 1994 survey of wargames the magazine gave Jetfighter: The Adventur two-plus stars out of five ("still an entertaining product"). Jetfighter II received three stars ("contemporary graphics and play value").

See also
 F-22 (series), a series of combat flight simulators by NovaLogic

References

External links
 

1988 video games
DOS games
DOS-only games
2K Games franchises
Take-Two Interactive franchises
Combat flight simulators
Video game franchises introduced in 1988
Video games developed in the United States
Windows games
Windows-only games